The men's discus throw event at the 1988 World Junior Championships in Athletics was held in Sudbury, Ontario, Canada, at Laurentian University Stadium on 27 and 28 July.  A 2 kg (senior implement) discus was used.

Medalists

Results

Final
28 July

Qualifications
27 Jul

Group A

Participation
According to an unofficial count, 18 athletes from 14 countries participated in the event.

References

Discus throw
Discus throw at the World Athletics U20 Championships